Frank H. DeGroat (May 7, 1916 – August 12, 1989) was an American farmer and legislator.

Born in Morton, Minnesota, DeGroat was a dairy and grain farmer in Lake Park, Minnesota. He served in the Minnesota House of Representatives from 1963 to 1976 as a Republican. In 1976, he lost the race for the United States House of Representatives. He died in Fargo, North Dakota.

Notes

1916 births
1989 deaths
People from Renville County, Minnesota
Republican Party members of the Minnesota House of Representatives
20th-century American politicians
People from Lake Park, Minnesota